The 1996 London Monarchs season was the fourth season for the franchise in the World League of American Football (WLAF). The team was led by head coach Bobby Hammond in his second year and interim head coach Lionel Taylor. The Monarchs played their home games at Wembley Stadium, White Hart Lane and Stamford Bridge in London, England. They finished the regular season in fifth place with a record of four wins and six losses.

Offseason

World League draft

Personnel

Staff

Roster

Schedule

Standings

Game summaries

Week 1: vs Scottish Claymores

Week 2: at Frankfurt Galaxy

Week 3: at Rhein Fire

Week 4: vs Barcelona Dragons

Week 5: at Amsterdam Admirals

Week 6: vs Frankfurt Galaxy

Week 7: vs Amsterdam Admirals

Week 8: at Barcelona Dragons

Week 9: at Scottish Claymores

Week 10: vs Rhein Fire

Notes

References

London Monarchs seasons